

The Spruce Tree Site (Smithsonian trinomial: 35TI75) is an archeological site located in Nehalem Bay State Park near Manzanita, Oregon, United States. The site likely represents a precontact/postcontact Nehalem Tillamook campsite used for subsistence activities, including fishing, hunting, food processing, tool manufacture, and related tasks. Radiocarbon dating based on a single sample suggests it may have been occupied as early as 1490 CE. The site has yielded rock flake debris, burned rock, and charcoal, while the presence of glass beads and small (2 to 3 mm) fragments of ceramic provide information potential related to early contacts between Europeans and the peoples of the Oregon coast. The porcelain fragments may also link it to the Nehalem Beeswax Shipwreck. The site has been partially eroded, but significant cultural deposits remain above the water line.

The Spruce Tree Site was listed on the National Register of Historic Places in 2001.

See also
Cronin Point Site
National Register of Historic Places listings in Tillamook County, Oregon

Notes

References

External links
, National Register of Historic Places cover documentation
Oregon Historic Sites Database entry

National Register of Historic Places in Tillamook County, Oregon
Native American Archeological Sites of the Oregon Coast MPS